The Sabah Truth Party or in  (KEBENARAN) is a political party based in Sabah, Malaysia mainly to serve as catalyst to be a Suluk community party. The Parti Kebenaran Sabah (KEBENARAN) claimed to be a Barisan Nasional (BN) friendly party. It is a relatively new party, was among the latest new parties registration approved by the Registrar of Society (RoS) and just received permission to operate as a political party in 2013.

See also
Politics of Malaysia
List of political parties in Malaysia

External links
 United Suluk Community Organization (USCO)  Blog
 Sabah Truth Party (KEBENARAN) Facebook

References

Political parties in Sabah
Political parties established in 2013
2013 establishments in Malaysia